Jurvarongpara alternatively Jurvarong Para is a hilly village of Bandarban District in the Chittagong Division of southeastern Bangladesh. It is situated in high hill with an average elevation of 665 feet.

Details

The village is in Ruma Upazila, under Paindu Union #1, Ward #4, 252 Khomongkhyang mauja. The village head (locally known as Karbari) is Rownem Bawm. It's a Bawm settlement that means the inhabitants are largely Bawm. All the locals are Christian. There are two churches in this village: Jurvarongpara Church, Jurvarongpara ECG Church. The village has a very little stream flowing near it and it's the primary source of their fresh water. Like any other hilly village, people there mostly live on hilly agriculture, locally known as jum chaash.

References

External links
 Expedition to the Jurvarongpara with geographic co-ordinates – Nishachor.com

Populated places in Bandarban District